The women's lightweight (56 kg/123.2 lbs) K-1 category at the W.A.K.O. World Championships 2007 in Belgrade was the second lightest of the female K-1 tournaments.  There were six women from two continents (Europe and Africa) taking part in the competition.  Each of the matches was three rounds of two minutes each and were fought under K-1 rules.   

Due to the low level of competitors for an eight-woman tournament, two fighters had byes through to the semi finals.  The tournament winner was Morocco's Souad Rochdi who defeated Alena Kuchynskaya from Belarus in the final to win the gold medal.  Poland's Natalia Grabowska and Italian Donatella Panu won bronze medals.

Results

See also
List of WAKO Amateur World Championships
List of WAKO Amateur European Championships
List of female kickboxers

References

External links
 WAKO World Association of Kickboxing Organizations Official Site

Kickboxing events at the WAKO World Championships 2007 Belgrade
2007 in kickboxing
Kickboxing in Serbia